Ohio City is one of the oldest neighborhoods in Cleveland, Ohio. It is located immediately west of the Cuyahoga River.

History
The City of Ohio became an independent municipality on March 3, 1836, splitting from Brooklyn Township.  The city grew from a population of 2,400 people in the early 1830s to over 4,000 in 1850.  The municipality was annexed by Cleveland on June 5, 1854.

James A. Garfield, who became the 20th president of the United States, frequently preached at Franklin Circle Christian Church in 1857.  Franklin Circle Christian Church is located at the intersection of Franklin Boulevard and Fulton Road.

The birthplace of John Heisman, famous for the annual Heisman Trophy awarded to the best player in college football, is located in Ohio City.  He was born in the neighborhood in 1869, and an Ohio Historical Society marker stands in commemoration near the corner of Bridge Avenue and West 29th Place.

Features
The salient feature of Ohio City's business district is the historic West Side Market, built in 1912.  The European-styled market, located at the intersection of Lorain Avenue and West 25th Street, draws an estimated one million visitors annually.  Located north of the West Side Market is The Ohio City Fresh Food Collaborative, one of the largest contiguous urban farms in America. The operation includes a farm, retail farm stand and community kitchen on a 6-acre city parcel.

Ohio City contains the largest concentration of craft breweries in Cleveland, which includes Hansa Brewing, Market Garden Brewery, Nanobrew, Platform Beer, Saucy Brew Works, Bad Tom Smith Brewing, and the state of Ohio's oldest microbrewery, the Great Lakes Brewing Company. (Both Market Garden and Great Lakes have fullscale brewpubs adjacent to the West Side Market, with the latter occupying a building that formerly housed the Market Tavern, a pub frequented by Eliot Ness.)

Saint Ignatius High School, a Jesuit college prep school, is located near the West Side Market. Founded in 1886, the school has a long list of distinguished  graduates and is a perennial contender in several OHSAA sports.

The Cleveland Hostel, which opened in 2012, is the first and only hostel in the city of Cleveland. The hostel is located on West 25th Street and Chatham Avenue adjacent to the W.25th Street Station on the RTA Red Line.

Serving as the only auxiliary location for the Cleveland Museum of Art, the Transformer Station, located at Church and West 29th Street, functions primarily as its contemporary art gallery space.

St. John's Episcopal Church, located at Church and West 26th Street, is the oldest consecrated building in Cuyahoga County and is the mother church of the current Episcopal cathedral located in downtown Cleveland.  The church was one of the final stops on the Underground Railroad in Northeastern Ohio, and the remains of an entrance to a tunnel leading to the banks of the nearby Cuyahoga River can still be seen in the basement.  Several nearby streets retain church-related names, such as Vestry.  An Episcopal parish continues to worship in the space, although membership has dramatically declined with the demographic changes in the neighborhood.

The Carnegie West Branch of Cleveland Public Library has been in continuous operation since opening in 1910. Designed by Edward Tilton, the architect of four buildings on Ellis Island in New York, Carnegie West features a modified Renaissance and classical style exterior. 

Ohio City has experienced a massive building and development boom in recent years. As such, the neighborhood has attracted young professionals, microbreweries, artisans, and locally owned shops and restaurants. It is widely regarded as one of Ohio's most trendy and welcoming neighborhoods for all ages, ethnicities, and lifestyles.

Demographics
The demographics of Ohio City have changed rather dramatically in the latter half of the 20th century and first part of the 21st. Originally composed mainly of English and German descendants, many Eastern European immigrants moved into the area during the migrations in the first half of the 20th century. In the 1960s and 1970s, as Cleveland expanded and the wealthy moved to the surrounding suburbs (including Parma, Brooklyn, and Lakewood), the percentage of African Americans increased.  The size of the Latino community has also increased.  However, Cleveland City Council, with an eye on redevelopment and with the incentive of tax breaks, has lured an increasing number of suburbanites of all backgrounds back into the Ohio City area.  This has led to a diverse community.

Gallery

References

External links 

Ohio City Near West Development Corporation
Ohio City
Ohio City Guide

 
Neighborhoods in Cleveland
Populated places on the Underground Railroad
James A. Garfield
English-American culture in Ohio
German-American culture in Cleveland
1836 establishments in Ohio
Populated places established in 1836
Historic districts in Cleveland
National Register of Historic Places in Cleveland, Ohio
Populated places established in 1818
Historic districts on the National Register of Historic Places in Ohio
Former municipalities in Ohio